Hardaway is a surname. Notable people with the surname include:
Ben Hardaway, animator
Benjamin F. Hardaway, American Medal of Honor recipient
Diamond and Silk, American pair of conservative political commentators
Lula Mae Hardaway, American songwriter and mother of singer Stevie Wonder
Penny Hardaway, American basketball player and coach
Robert A. Hardaway, Confederate artillery officer and college professor
Tim Hardaway, American basketball player
Tim Hardaway Jr., son of the above, American basketball player

See also
Hardaway High School, in Columbus, Georgia
Charles Hardaway Marks Bridges, in Virginia
Hardway (disambiguation), includes list of people with surname Hardway